50 Berkeley Square is a reportedly haunted townhouse on Berkeley Square in Mayfair, Central London. In the late 19th century it became known as one of the most haunted houses in London, with its attic room said to be haunted by the spirit of a young woman who had committed suicide there.

Researchers have since suggested that the stories may have derived from the odd behaviour of house's occupant, Thomas Myers, who slept during the day and made unusual sounds in the house at night. It has also been noted that many of the stories about the house were exaggerated or invented by later writers about its ghosts.

Legend

The legend about the house varies, but most versions state that the attic room of the house is haunted by the spirit of a young woman who committed suicide there. She purportedly threw herself from a top-floor window after being abused by her uncle and is said to be capable of frightening people to death. The spirit is said to take the form of a brown mist, though sometimes it is reported as a white figure. A rarer version of the tale is that a young man was locked in the attic room, fed only through a hole in the door, until he eventually went mad and died. Another story is that the attic room is haunted by the ghost of a little girl who was killed there by a sadistic servant.

From 1859 until the early 1870s Thomas Myers, who was rumoured to have been rejected by his fiancée, lived in the house. He lived alone and it was said that he locked himself inside and slowly went mad until his death at the age of 76 in November 1874. During his residence in the house it fell into gross disrepair and its reputation began to develop.

It is alleged that in 1872, on a bet, Lord Lyttleton stayed a night in the building's attic. He brought his shotgun with him and fired at an apparition. In the morning he attempted to find the apparition, but could only find shotgun cartridges. The following year the local council issued a summons to the house's owners for failure to pay taxes, but it is claimed that they were not prosecuted because of the house's reputation for being haunted.

In 1879 a piece in the Mayfair Magazine alleged that a maid who stayed in the attic room had been found mad and had died in an asylum the day after. It was also alleged that after a nobleman spent the night in the attic room he was so paralyzed with fear that he could not speak.

In 1887 it was alleged that two sailors from HMS Penelope stayed a night in the house. By morning one was found dead, having tripped as he ran from the house. The other reported having seen the ghost of Myers approaching them aggressively.

Modern interest in the site was spurred by its inclusion in Peter Underwood's book Haunted London (1975).

No phenomena have been reported since the house was bought by the Maggs Brothers in the late 1930s and, though many contemporary media outlets have reported happenings at the house, more recent investigators claim that nothing unusual has ever taken place there. They remark that events in Edward Bulwer-Lytton's story "The Haunted and the Haunters" bear a remarkable resemblance to the supposed hauntings at 50 Berkeley Square.

Sceptical reception

There were three sets of correspondence about 50 Berkeley Square in the journal Notes and Queries, in 1872–73, 1879 and 1880–81. A common conclusion was that the neglect of the house had inspired the imaginative stories about hauntings.

In her autobiography, published in 1906, Lady Dorothy Nevill stated that Mr Myers was a relative of hers. After he had lost his fiancée his behaviour "bordered upon lunacy" and he stayed in the house all day, becoming active at night, when he rambled about, making strange sounds. According to Nevill, the "old house would occasionally appear to be lit up at the dead of night". She considered that Myers's nocturnal activities had been misinterpreted by others as evidence of a ghost. She concluded that the haunting had no factual basis and that the "whole story was nonsense".

Modern researchers have suggested that the house was never haunted and that many of the stories were either exaggerated or invented by later writers. For example, the claim that sailors entered the house in the 1870s was invented by Elliott O'Donnell and there is no evidence to confirm any part of the story.

References

External links
 WalksOfLondon.co.uk – 50 Berkeley Square, The Most Haunted House In London

Houses in the City of Westminster
Reportedly haunted locations in London
Buildings and structures in Mayfair